E. Lynn Harris ( Everette Lynn Jeter; June 20, 1955 – July 23, 2009) was an American author. Openly gay, he was best known for his depictions of African-American men who were on the down-low and closeted. He authored ten consecutive books that made The New York Times Best Seller list, making him among the most successful African-American or gay authors of his era.

Biography
Born Everette Lynn Jeter in Flint, Michigan, Harris moved to Little Rock, Arkansas, with his mother at the age of 3. Upon his mother's marriage to Ben Harris, his surname was changed to Harris. By the time he was 13 years old, his mother divorced his stepfather who had abused Harris for years.

Harris was one of the first African-American students at Forest Heights Junior High and Hall High School in Little Rock. Harris had homes in Houston, Texas, Atlanta, Georgia, and Fayetteville, Arkansas.

In his writings, Harris maintained a poignant motif, occasionally emotive, that incorporated vernacular and slang from popular culture.
Harris became the first black male cheerleader as well as the first black yearbook editor while attending the University of Arkansas. After graduation, he became a computer salesman with IBM, AT&T, and Hewlett-Packard for 13 years living in Dallas, Washington, D.C., and Atlanta. In 1990, Harris attempted suicide during a dark phase of depression and heavy drinking but later found the will to live through his writing. Harris relieved himself of his salesman duties and quit in order to begin writing his first novel.

Harris was initially unable to land a book deal with a publishing house for his first work, Invisible Life, so he published it himself and sold copies from his car trunk. He later was published by Doubleday, and ten of his novels achieved New York Times bestseller status.

He returned to the University of Arkansas in 2004 to teach African American Fiction, quickly becoming a student favorite. Alongside fiction, Harris had also penned a personal memoir, What Becomes of the Brokenhearted.

In June 2019, Harris was one of the inaugural fifty American “pioneers, trailblazers, and heroes” inducted on the National LGBTQ Wall of Honor within the Stonewall National Monument (SNM) in New York City’s Stonewall Inn. The SNM is the first U.S. national monument dedicated to LGBTQ rights and history, and the wall's unveiling was timed to take place during the 50th anniversary of the Stonewall riots.

Invisible Life
Harris completed his first novel, Invisible Life, in 1991. The novel is a coming-of-age story dealing with then-taboo topics. Most important was that it openly questioned sexual identity and told the story of main character Raymond Tyler. Tyler, torn between his married male lover and girlfriend Nicole, is a New York attorney struggling with identifying as a bisexual black man. He ultimately settles into gay life, while much of the novel is dedicated to Tyler's reflection on that choice.

Just As I Am 
Just As I Am is Harris' second novel and the sequel to Invisible Life. During the height of the AIDS epidemic, it follows Raymond Winston Tyler and his former lover Nicole Springer. Raymond moves from New York to Atlanta to work as a sports lawyer. Raymond continues to live his life carefully coming to terms with his bisexuality. He is somewhat attracted to an allegedly heterosexual coworker and fears it will lead to his own exposure. A former acquaintance, John Basil Henderson becomes his client. John is charming, charismatic, problematic, closeted (although his attraction to masculine men and the way he carries himself convince him he is straight) and attracted to Raymond. In the meantime, Nicole has found a wealthy white lover that she agrees to marry despite his demanding and possessive tendencies. She is not sure if she loves him. However he is funding her theater endeavors on Broadway. Raymond and Nicole cross paths after years apart when Raymond returns to New York to aid their mutual friend Kyle who contracts HIV.

And This Too Shall Pass 
Harris’ third novel And This Too Shall Pass follows the intertwining stories of Zurich Robinson, Mia Miller, Tamela Coleman, and Sean Elliot. Zurich is a rookie quarterback on the rise in the ranks of the Chicago Cougars. Zurich is reserved, celibate, guarded with his private life and quite religious due to his upbringing. Sean Elliot is an openly gay journalist living in Manhattan, who entertains a string of inconsequential dalliances. Sean graciously accepts the assignment of writing a profile on Zurich. As the two get closer, Sean begins to feel stronger about Zurich. While getting closer, Zurich declines the advances of Mia Miller. Mia is an admiring sportscaster, who struggles with alcoholism in the midst of being sexually assaulted, for which she accuses Zurich. In an attempt to clear his name, Zurich hires Tamela Coleman, who has dreams of leaving corporate law to hopefully open her own firm. While swearing off of men, Tamela begins a fling with police officer Caliph Taylor, whom she begins to consider and question the chance of a future with.

If  This World Were Mine 
Harris' fourth novel tells the stories of four former college classmates. The group formed a club where they collectively chronicle their lives in a shared journal in order to keep their friendship alive. Nearly twenty years pass and the four are still holding to their traditions. Riley Woodson is concerned with the stagnation on her own marriage. She is a kept woman raising her kids while her husband is always away on business. She really wants to be a poet/singer. However, her friends try to gently dissuade her. Her friends lack of support coupled with a desire for support and validation and missing her husband, she begins a flirtatious online email exchange. Dwight Scott is a computer engineer fed up with prejudiced microaggressions, his own prejudices cause him problems at his job as he considers leaving to work for an all-black firm in Washington. Yolanda Williams is a serious, take charge media consultant. After ended an unfulfilling marriage, Yolanda seeing a new man who surprises her with limousine rides and trips. Leland Thompson is a gay psychiatrist who is still coping with the loss of his lover Donald to AIDS. Leland's client recognizes an old flame and adversary and shares with Leland. Leland's client knows Yolanda's newest beau, John Basil Henderson intimately. Leland struggles with an ethical dilemma of keeping this news from Yolanda.

Abide With Me 
The third book in the Invisible Life trilogy and Harris’ fifth novel is Abide With Me. Raymond returns living in Seattle with his new boyfriend, college fraternity brother, Trent. Trent is thriving as an architect and Raymond's own law career is going well. Raymond's sudden nomination for a federal judge position comes as good news but raises concerns for Raymond as background checks bring up issues surrounding his sexuality and secrets from Trent's past. In New York, Nicole Springer is enjoying marital bliss with Raymond's straight best friend, Jared. While starring in a traveling production of Dreamgirls. However, Nicole's understudy, Yancey Harrington Braxton is out to knock her out of the spotlight and is willing to do whatever it takes to accomplish her goal. Additionally, Raymond's ex-lover John Basil Henderson reappears in therapy for help with his manipulative, destructive ways and coping with his own bisexuality.

Not A Day Goes By 
Harris' sixth novel, Not A Day Goes By, finished in 2000, is the prequel to Any Way The Wind Blows. John "Basil" Henderson is an ex-footballer turned sports agent who meets Yancey Harrington Braxton, an aspiring Broadway starlet. The two begin a tryst thinking that they have found their match in each other. However, John struggles with the truth of his sexuality, complicated feelings for men, commitment all while the two plan a lavish wedding.

Any Way the Wind Blows
Harris' 2002 novel, Any Way the Wind Blows, is the sequel to his previous book, Not A Day Goes By. It follows the jilted Yancey Harrington as she pursues success and stardom in L.A, and her wayward bisexual ex-fiancé Basil Henderson, who has left thoughts of matrimony behind in favor of singledom.

What Becomes of the Brokenhearted: A Memoir
What Becomes of the Brokenhearted: A Memoir is E. Lynn Harris' autobiographical reflection. It concerns the rise of a small-town boy to a successful writer, detailing his battle with depression and "coming out" experience as a gay African American.

A Love of My Own
A Love of My Own is Harris' 2003 novel, which won Blackboard's "Novel of the Year Award". It details a year in the lives of several characters living in New York. It is narrated alternately by Zola Norwood, editor of a hip-hop magazine, and Raymond Tyler Jr., the magazine's CEO. It deals with both the trials and tribulations of the characters' love and work lives against the backdrop of the cultural and political events of 2001 and 2002.

I Say A Little Prayer 
Harris’ ninth novel, I Say A Little Prayer is the story of Chauncey Greer. Chauncey is the owner of his own greeting card company in Atlanta, Cute Boy Card Company. In his teen years Chauncey was a boy band member, but stepped down when rumors circulated around the romantic involvement with group member, D. Now Chauncey approaches forty after dates with men and women. Chauncey concerned with the questions of women, decides to exclusively pursue male romantic partners. However, a slew of bad dates leads him back to the church and reignites within his passion for music. After singing, Chauncey is thrust back into the spotlight and asked to sing at an upcoming revival. Chauncey soon discovers that the revival is being used to galvanize his homophobic rhetoric. Chauncey as well as other LBGTQ+ members of the church and their allies all team up to stage a day of absence where they vow to be absent from service in protest. The plan is set but threatens to be derailed when D makes a resurgence in Chauncey's life, and in a big way.

Just Too Good to Be True 
Just Too Good to Be True is Harris' tenth solo novel. It follows Brady Bledsoe and his close relationship with his single mother Carmyn. Carmyn is a devoted mother who has seen to it that Brady have every opportunity to succeed and reach his dreams of playing professional football. Brady has taken a vow of celibacy, and now during his senior year at college Brady is poised for an NFL slot and a chance at the Heisman Trophy. A female cheerleader named Barret has set her sights on Brady as she sees a chance for the good life by tempting Brady to renounce his celibacy.  Brady's mother has her own secrets that threaten to rear heads as she tries to protect Brady from her past mistakes. However, the harder she tries to protect him the further apart they drift.

Basketball Jones 
Basketball Jones is Harris' eleventh solo novel. Aldridge James Richardson, a.k.a. AJ lives a privileged life of not working although holding two college degrees. His lifestyle is maintained by his closeted boyfriend Dray Jones, the rich and famous basketball player. Dray has been juggling his professional image and secret life with AJ since they met years ago in college. Although their relationship is enough to satisfy them, Dray's teammates begin to question their closeness. In an attempt to put rumors to rest, Dray weds the ambitious and attractive Judi. Someone is blackmailing the lovers to keep them apart, and fingers point to Judi. But if it is Judi, she cannot be working alone.

Mama Dearest 
Mama Dearest is Harris' twelfth solo novel that follows Yancey Harrington, the ex-lover of John Basil Henderson as she woos a wealthy lover to help her reach her dreams moving from theater to of reality television stardom. While Yancey is trying to make her mark her finances are shaky, her spotlight is being hogged by up-and-coming R&B artist named Madison B., and her mother Ava Middlebrooks has been paroled with Yancey's knowledge. Ava is a bitter and jealous of her daughter's good fortune and even after a period in prison, she is still out for revenge. Ava sees Yancey as her number-one rival and is hell-bent on destroying her, by using Madison B and her connection to Yancey.

In My Father's House
In My Father's House is Harris' thirteenth solo work and twelfth novel. It follows out-and-proud gay man Bentley Dean and his partner Alexandra as they sit at the head of their business Picture Perfect Modeling Agency. The agency falls into a financial struggle, so Bentley against his better judgment accept a job for celebrity party planner Sterling Sneed. Sterling as promised an obscene payday if Picture Perfect can provide fifteen models for an exclusive A-list event he's hosting. The models are supposed to be eye candy and entertainment. If they choose to partake in other forms of entertainment, it is up to their own discretion. At the last minute, one of the models drops and Bentley desperate to fill it enlists the help of Jah, a young up and coming model and Bentley's protégé. Bentley sees Jah as his own. Soon Jah is in love with Seth Sinclair an attractive actor that Jah met at Sterling Sneed's party. Bentley is concerned over Jah's youth and naivete, Seth Sinclair's closeted lifestyle, as well as his heterosexual marriage that makes Seth unpredictable and dangerous in Bentley's eyes.

No One in  the World 
Harris' fifteenth novel and last work, No One In The World, was released posthumously as a collaborative venture with author R. M. Johnson in 2012. The novel tells the story of twin brothers separated at birth and reacquainted in their 30s after the untimely death of their parents. Cobi Winslow and Eric Reed have lived vastly different lives with Cobi being closeted, well-educated district attorney, while his brother Eric being raised in the foster care system is a heterosexual career criminal. Cobi's wealthy father leaves a hearty inheritance of his father's estate and their family's business for Cobi with the stipulation that he must marry a woman before his 35th birthday. Cobi needs the money to fund his campaign for city council. In an attempt to help, Cobi's sister seeks and pays Austen Greer, a former businesswoman who has fallen on hard times due to the recession to play the part of Cobi's wife. Eric learns of these details and is sworn to secrecy. However, he trusts his former cellmate Blac with the details, who then cozies up to Cobi in order to obtain a $150,000 loan from Cobi to pay back his own debts.

Death
Harris died on July 23, 2009, while in Los Angeles, California, for a business meeting. He was found unconscious at the Peninsula Hotel in Beverly Hills, and was pronounced dead at Cedars-Sinai Medical Center in Los Angeles. According to the Office of the Los Angeles County Coroner, he died of heart disease complicated by a hardening of the arteries and high blood pressure.

Bibliography
 Invisible Life (self-published 1991, mass-marketed 1994)
 Just As I Am (1995), winner of Blackboard's Novel of the Year Award
 And This Too Shall Pass (1997)
 If This World Were Mine (1998), winner of James Baldwin Award for Literary Excellence
 Abide With Me (1999)
 Not A Day Goes By (2000)
 "Money Can't Buy Me Love" (2000) (short story), in Got to Be Real – 4 Original Love Stories by Eric Jerome Dickey, Marcus Major, E. Lynn Harris and Colin Channer (2001)
 Any Way the Wind Blows (2002), winner of Blackboard's Novel of the Year Award* 
 A Love of My Own (2003), winner of Blackboard's Novel of the Year Award
 What Becomes Of The Brokenhearted – A Memoir (2003)
 Freedom in This Village: Twenty-Five Years of Black Gay Men's Writing, 1979 to the Present (editor, 2005)
 I Say a Little Prayer (2006)
 Just Too Good To Be True (2008)
 Basketball Jones (2009)
 Mama Dearest (2009) (posthumously released)
 In My Father's House (2010) (posthumously released)
 No One in the World (2012) (posthumously released)

References

External links
 Official Publisher Page.
 
 
 Obituary in The New York Times.
 Audio Interview with E. Lynn Harris.

1955 births
2009 deaths
20th-century American novelists
21st-century American novelists
African-American novelists
American male novelists
American soap opera writers
American gay writers
Lambda Literary Award winners
LGBT African Americans
People from Fayetteville, Arkansas
Writers from Flint, Michigan
Screenwriters from Arkansas
American LGBT novelists
LGBT people from Michigan
American male screenwriters
Screenwriters from Michigan
20th-century American male writers
21st-century American male writers
Novelists from Michigan
American male television writers
20th-century American screenwriters
African-American screenwriters
20th-century African-American writers
21st-century African-American writers
20th-century LGBT people
21st-century LGBT people
African-American male writers